Splicing factor, arginine/serine-rich 12 is a protein that in humans is encoded by the SFRS12 gene.

SFRS12 belongs to the superfamily of serine/arginine-rich (SR) splicing factors. It modulates splice site selection by regulating the activities of other SR proteins (Barnard et al., 2002).[supplied by OMIM]

References

Further reading